Omoglymmius cheesmanae is a species of beetle in the subfamily Rhysodidae. It was described by Arrow in 1942.

References

cheesmanae
Beetles described in 1942